International Publisher Ltd. (or International Publisher LLC) is a fraudulent academic publishing company that coordinates the unethical sale of authorship positions on academic research papers. The company is headquartered in Moscow (Russia) with offices in Ukraine, Kazakhstan, and Iran, and lists its chief editor as Ksenia Badziun.

The company was exposed by scientific misconduct tracking website Retraction Watch in 2019. In 2022, a preprint on arxiv.org was covered by Science Magazine detailing how International Publisher Ltd. had published hundreds of academic papers across diverse academic journals, including from respected publishing companies. In 2019, the scientific indexing company Clarivate's Web of Science group sent International Publisher Ltd. a cease-and-desist letter, which was ignored.

References 

Scientific misconduct